John Angus Rae Blain (born 4 January 1979) is a Scottish first-class cricketer. He is a right-handed batsman, and a right-arm fast-medium pace bowler. In May 2019, he was inducted into Cricket Scotland's Hall of Fame. However, in July 2022, Blain was "temporarily suspended" from the hall of fame.

Playing career 

Attaining his first cap in 1996, Blain became Scotland's youngest-capped cricketer since 1890. He played during the 1996 European Championship taking seven wickets at 9.85. Blain was initially signed as a footballer to Falkirk but decided to switch to cricket, signing for Northamptonshire, having not made an impact as a footballer.

Blain left Northamptonshire County Cricket Club at the end of the 2003 season to join Yorkshire County Cricket Club, where he made sporadic appearances for the first team until he was initially released in 2006.

He played for Yorkshire League side, Rotherham Cricket Club in 2007, and was due to sign for the Scottish League side, Ferguslie, in 2008. The move fell through, and Blain played for the Scottish Saltires and Rotherham.

He appeared in all Scotland's games at the 1999 and 2007 World Cups. He finished the 1999 event with 10 wickets at 21 with a strike rate of 22.3, the best in the tournament.

In the 2010, Blain made a solitary appearance for Yorkshire in the County Championship, and in both that campaign and in 2011, Blain was the regular captain of Yorkshire's Second XI.

Coaching career 

Blain is an ECB Level 4 Coach. Blain was named as head coach of Grange Cricket Club. He also played as player-cum-coach with West of Scotland Cricket Club from 2010 to 2013. He was name head coach of newly formed team Eastern Knights  which will play in Regional Pro Series.

References

External links
Cricket Europe Stats Zone profile

1979 births
Living people
Cricketers from Edinburgh
Scottish cricketers
Scotland One Day International cricketers
Scotland Twenty20 International cricketers
Northamptonshire cricketers
Yorkshire cricketers
Commonwealth Games competitors for Scotland
Cricketers at the 1998 Commonwealth Games
Cricketers at the 1999 Cricket World Cup
Cricketers at the 2007 Cricket World Cup
Yorkshire cricket captains
Scottish footballers
Falkirk F.C. players
Scottish cricket coaches
Association footballers not categorized by position